Diamond Lake is a lake in Kandiyohi County, in the U.S. state of Minnesota.

Diamond Lake was so named for its clear and sparkling waters.

See also
List of lakes in Minnesota

References

Lakes of Minnesota
Lakes of Kandiyohi County, Minnesota